Sandglass (also known as The Hourglass) is a South Korean television series. It is one of the highest-rated Korean dramas in history, and is also considered one of the most significant. Written by Song Ji-na, directed by Kim Jong-hak and produced by their own company Jcom, it aired on SBS in 1995 in 24 episodes.

A depiction of the tragic relationship among three friends affected by the political and civilian oppression of 1970s and 1980s Korea, the series mixed politics, melodrama, and action. It recorded a peak rating of 64.5%, the fourth highest of all time, and launched its leading trio of Choi Min-soo, Go Hyun-jung, and Park Sang-won into stardom. Its reenactment of the Gwangju Uprising (interspersed with archival video footage) has been called one of the most realistic and memorable moments in Korean TV history.

Synopsis
Sandglass is the story of two men whose friendship is put to the test through the 1970s and 1980s, one of Korea's politically tumultuous periods. Park Tae-soo (Choi Min-soo), tough and loyal, grows up to become a gangster. Kang Woo-suk (Park Sang-won), smart with firm moral values, grows up to become a prosecutor. Yoon Hye-rin (Go Hyun-jung), a beautiful and spirited daughter of a very wealthy casino owner, not true, they live in the same private dormitory. Hye-rin is introduced to Tae-soo via Woo-suk and they fall in love.

A notable aspect of the series is its handling of the 1980 Gwangju Democratization Movement, an event during which the head of the military junta (which had taken over South Korea after the assassination of President Park Chung-hee), General Chun Doo-hwan, sent paratroopers into Gwangju to put down the uprising resulting in a massacre of hundreds of civilians. A taboo subject during the airing of the series, the violent scenes (based on individual accounts) resulted in shock and grief for the South Koreans at that time. (The mid-90s South Korea had not come to terms with what happened after government muzzled free speech.) After the drama aired, there was a visible output of films dealing with the subject (such as A Petal (1996) and Peppermint Candy (2000)). It even influenced the prosecution of ex-President Chun Doo-hwan responsible for the massacre (he was finally jailed, decades after the incident).

Cast

Choi Min-soo as Park Tae-soo 
Park Sang-won as Kang Woo-suk 
Go Hyun-jung as Yoon Hye-rin 
Lee Jung-jae as Baek Jae-hee 
Park Geun-hyung as President Yoon, Hye-rin's father
Jung Sung-mo as Lee Jong-do
Jo Min-su as Woo-suk's wife
Lee Seung-yeon as Reporter Shin
Kim Jong-gyul as Lawyer Min
Jo Kyung-hwan
Kim Byung-ki as Kang Dong-hwan
Jo Hyung-ki
Kim In-moon as Tae-soo's father
Jang Hang-sun
Kim Young-ae as Tae-soo's mother
Im Hyun-sik as assistant prosecutor
Kim Jung-hyun
Hong Kyung-in
Lee Hee-do
Maeng Sang-hoon
Lee Doo-il
Park Young-ji
Son Hyun-joo
Jung Myung-hwan
Kim Jung-hak
Han Kyung-sun
Choi Jae-ho
Kim Myung-gook
Do Yong-gook
Park Sang-jo

Ratings
 In the table below, the blue numbers represent the lowest ratings and the red numbers represent the highest ratings.

Reception
Traffic was visibly lighter and pubs reported slow business as government officials, students and office workers alike headed home early to watch Sandglass every Monday through Thursday evenings.

Sandglass remains one of the highest-rated TV series in Korean broadcasting history (by single episode viewership rating):

 그대 그리고 나 - You and I (66.9% / 1998-04-26 / MBC)
 첫사랑 - First Love (65.8% / 1997-04-20 / KBS2)
 사랑이 뭐길래 - What is Love? (64.9% / 1992-05-24 / MBC)
 모래시계 - Sandglass (64.5% / 1995-02-06 / SBS)
 허준 - Hur Jun (63.5% / 2000-06-27 / MBC)
 젊은이의 양지 - Youth's Sunny Place (62.7% / 1995-11-12 / KBS2)
 아들과 딸 - Son and Daughter (61.1% / 1993-03-21 / MBC)
 태조왕건 - Taejo Wang Geon (60.2% / 2001-05-20 / KBS1)
 여명의 눈동자 - Eyes of Dawn (58.4% / 1992-02-06 / MBC)
 대장금 - Dae Jang Geum (57.8% / 2004-03-23 / MBC)

A song, titled "Zhuravli" ("crane"), by a Russian singer Joseph Kobzon was featured in the series. Although many Koreans did not understand the lyrics, it is still one of the most widely recognized song in Korea thanks to the show's popularity. The song actually mourns the Soviet soldiers killed while defending their homeland and who later became cranes. The lyrics blend well with the theme of the show since one of the major plot devices of the show, the Gwangju Massacre, commemorates the dead who were caught in the middle of the tragedy.

Accolades

Reruns 
As a tribute to the late director Kim Jong-hak (who died on July 23, 2013), cable subsidiary SBS Plus aired reruns of Sandglass from July 29 to August 15, 2013 at 20:40 every Monday, Tuesday, Wednesday and Thursday, with two consecutive episodes per night. This was exactly how the show was originally broadcast in 1995.

References

External links 
Sandglass official SBS website 

Seoul Broadcasting System television dramas
1995 South Korean television series debuts
1995 South Korean television series endings
Korean-language television shows
1990s South Korean television series
Television series set in the 1960s
Television series set in the 1970s
Television series set in the 1980s
South Korean political television series
Works about the Gwangju Uprising
Television shows written by Song Ji-na
Television shows set in Gwangju